Nicrophorus marginatus is a burying beetle described by Johan Christian Fabricius in 1801.

References

Silphidae
Beetles of North America
Taxa named by Johan Christian Fabricius
Beetles described in 1801